Squamipalpis subnubila is a species of moth of the family Noctuidae first described by John Henry Leech in 1900. It is found in Taiwan.

References

Moths described in 1900
Herminiinae